Pseudaminobacter  is a genus of Gram-negative, oxidase- and  catalase-positive, rod-shaped bacteria.

References

Phyllobacteriaceae
Bacteria genera